Hale Rice Hamilton (February 28, 1880 – May 19, 1942) was an American actor, writer and producer.

Biography
Hamilton was born in Topeka, Kansas in 1880. (His birth year is sometimes listed as either 1879 or 1883.) His brother was politician John Daniel Miller Hamilton. 

Hamilton's Broadway debut was in Don Caesar's Return (1901).

He was married to three actresses, Jane Oaker, Myrtle Tannehill, and Grace La Rue. Tannehill sued Hamilton, accusing him of being lured away from her by La Rue.

He filed bankruptcy in 1937.

He died of a cerebral hemorrhage in 1942 in Hollywood, California.

Selected filmography

Her Painted Hero (1915, Short) - A Matinee Idol
The Winning of Beatrice (1918) - Robert Howard
Opportunity (1918) - Anthony Fry
Five Thousand an Hour (1918) - Johnny Gamble
The Return of Mary (1918, Writer)
Johnny-on-the-Spot (1919) - Johnny Rutledge
That's Good (1919) (with Grace La Rue) - Marcellus Starr
After His Own Heart (1919) - Thomas Wentworth Duncan
Full of Pep (1919) - Jimmy Baxter
In His Brother's Place (1919) - Nelson Drake / J. Barrington Drake
The Four-Flusher (1919) - Lon Withers
His Children's Children (1923) - Rufus Kayne
The Manicure Girl (1925) - James Morgan
The Greater Glory (1926) - Leon Krum
The Great Gatsby (1926) - Tom Buchanan
Tin Gods (1926) - Dr. McCoy
Summer Bachelors (1926) - Beverly Greenway
Girl in the Rain (1927)
The Telephone Girl (1927) - Mark
Good Intentions (1930) - Franklin Graham
Common Clay (1930) - Judge Samuel Filson
Paid (1930) - District Attorney Demarest
Beau Ideal (1931) - Maj. LeBaudy
Dance, Fools, Dance (1931) - Mr. Selby
The Drums of Jeopardy (1931) - Martin Kent
A Tailor Made Man (1931) - Mr. Stanlaw
Strangers May Kiss (1931) - Andrew
Never the Twain Shall Meet (1931) - Mark Mellenger
The Great Lover (1931) - Stapleton
Rebound (1931) - Lyman Patterson
Murder at Midnight (1931) - Phillip Montrose
New Adventures of Get Rich Quick Wallingford (1931) - Charles Harper
Susan Lenox (Her Fall and Rise) (1931) - Mike Kelly
The Champ (1931) - Tony Carleton
The Cuban Love Song (1931) - John
A Fool's Advice (1932) - George Diamond
Love Affair (1932) - Bruce Hardy
Two Against the World (1932) - Mr. Gordon Mitchell
Life Begins (1932) - Dr. Cramm
Those We Love (1932) - Blake
The Most Dangerous Game (1932) - Bill - Owner of Yacht (uncredited)
A Successful Calamity (1932) - John Belde -\sWilton's Business Associate
Three on a Match (1932) - Defense Attorney
I Am a Fugitive from a Chain Gang (1932) - Rev. Robert Allen
Call Her Savage (1932) - Cyrus Randall (uncredited)
Manhattan Tower (1932) - David Witman
The Billion Dollar Scandal (1933) - Jackson
Employees' Entrance (1933) - Monroe
Reform Girl (1933) - Santor Putnam
Parole Girl (1933) - Anthony 'Tony' Grattan
Black Beauty (1933) - Harlan Bledsoe
Strange People (1933) - J.E.Burton - the Attorney
One Man's Journey (1933) - Dr. Tillinghast
The Wolf Dog (1933, Serial) - Norman Bryan
Curtain at Eight (1933) - Major Manning
Sitting Pretty (1933) - Vinton (uncredited)
Twin Husbands (1933) - Colonel Gordon Lewis
 The Quitter (1934) - Maj. Stephen Winthrop
City Park (1934) - Herbert Ransome
Private Scandal (1934) - Jim Orrington (uncredited)
Dr. Monica (1934) - Dr. Brent
The Girl from Missouri (1934) - Charlie Turner
Big Hearted Herbert (1934) - Mr. Havens
When Strangers Meet (1934) - Captain Manning
The Marines Are Coming (1934) - Colonel Gilroy
Grand Old Girl (1935) - Killaine
After Office Hours (1935) - Henry King Patterson
The Woman in Red (1935) - Wyatt Furness
Hold 'Em Yale (1935) - Mr. Wilmot
Let 'Em Have It (1935) - Ex-Senator Reilly
The Nitwits (1935) - Winfield Lake
Calm Yourself (1935) - Mr. M.B. Kent
Dante's Inferno (1935) - Mr. Wallace (uncredited)
I Live My Life (1935) - Uncle Carl
Three Kids and a Queen (1935) - Ralph
The Adventures of Marco Polo (1938) - Maffeo Polo (uncredited)
Edison, the Man (1940) - Broker (uncredited) (final film role)

References

External links

 
 
Portrait 1930 (University of Washington, Sayre)

1880 births
1942 deaths
American male film actors
Male actors from Kansas
Actors from Topeka, Kansas
20th-century American male actors
Burials at Cypress Lawn Memorial Park